William Strode (1698–1776) was a British Army officer. He was Colonel in Chief of the 62nd Regiment of Foot from 1758 until 1776.

Life
He joined the British Army in 1716.

At the creation of the Wiltshire Regiment (62nd Regiment of Foot) in 1758 he was created its first commander.

In 1760 with Lt Col John Jennings he was charged with holding Carrickfergus Castle which on 23 February was attacked by a French force of 600 men.

In 1763 he was posted with his regiment to the West Indies before joining General Howe in Canada.

In 1770 he paid for the erection of a monument to the Duke of Cumberland in Cavendish Square. The statue was removed from the pedestal in the Second World War and has now been lost.

In 1772 he was based with his regiment in Oughterard in western Ireland. In July 1773 he moved to Dublin and in August 1774 to Cork. In July 1775 he moved briefly to Ballyshannon and soon after to Ballinroabe. In October 1775 he returned to Ballyshannon where he was joined by Lt Col John Anstruther.

In 1772 he was court-martialled for failing to adequately clothe his regiment. He was found not guilty but asked to reimburse any man who had to pay for his own uniform.

On 31 December 1775 he was posted to Galway. He died in Galway on 14 January 1776. His body was returned to England and he is buried in the nave of Westminster Abbey the supreme accolade. His tomb id designed by Richard Hayward.

Valentine Jones became Colonel in Chief following his death and the regiment was reposted to North America to fight in the Revolutionary War.

References
 

1698 births
1776 deaths
British Army generals
Burials at Westminster Abbey
Wiltshire Regiment officers
British Army personnel of the Seven Years' War
British Army personnel who were court-martialled